East Low German is a group of Low German dialects spoken in north-eastern Germany as well as by minorities in northern Poland. Together with West Low German dialects, it forms a dialect continuum of the Low German language.  Before 1945, the dialect was spoken along the entire then-German-settled Baltic Coast from Mecklenburg, through Pomerania, West Prussia into certain villages of the East Prussian Klaipėda Region.

East Pomeranian, Central Pomeranian and West Pomeranian should not be confused with the West Slavic Pomeranian language.

Related languages
East Low German belongs to the dialect continuum of the continental West Germanic languages. It developed from the older Middle Low German.

In the West it fades into West Low German. The distinction is usually made referring to the plural endings of the verbs: East Low German endings are based on the old first person ending: -e(n), whereas West Low German endings are based on the old second person ending: -(e)t. The categorization of the Low German dialects into an Eastern and a Western group is not made by all linguists.

In the South, it fades into East Central German. The difference is that the East Low German varieties have not been affected by the High German consonant shift. The areas affected by the High German consonant shift are still expanding today, especially the Berlinerisch dialect that is gaining ground on the Brandenburgisch dialect by which it is surrounded.

Dialects
East Low German dialects are:
 In Germany:
 Brandenburgisch (Brandenburgish; in Brandenburg, northern Saxony-Anhalt), incl. Middle Pomeranian
 Mecklenburgisch-Vorpommersch (Mecklenburgish-West Pomeranian; in Mecklenburg-Vorpommern)
 In Poland since 1945 (before that Pomerania, Prussia, Germany):
 East Pomeranian (spoken by minorities in Pomerania and Brazil)
 Low Prussian (spoken by minorities around Danzig in northern Poland; nearly extinct since 1945, considered to include Plautdietsch by some observers)

For some it also includes Plautdietsch (originating from Danzig), which is spoken by Mennonites in North America, Mexico and a few other places in the world. In Berlin a version of Brandenburgisch was spoken in medieval times until the city took up an East Central German dialect that incorporated Brandenburgisch elements and developed into today's Berlin[er]isch.

Baltendeutsch is a High German variety influenced by East Low German formerly spoken by Germans in the Baltic states.

Pomeranian dialects 
In Pomerania, several dialects of East Low German are, or were, spoken:
 West Pomeranian (German: Vorpommersch), a dialect of Mecklenburgisch-Vorpommersch
 West Central Pomeranian (Westmittelpommersch) and East Central Pomeranian Ostmittelpommersch) – dialects of Brandenburgisch
 East Pomeranian-West Prussian (Hinterpommersch-Westpreußisch, extinct in Europe, living in Brazil)
 Western East Pomeranian (Westhinterpommersch)
 Eastern East Pomeranian (Osthinterpommersch)
 Bublitzisch
 Pommerellisch

The German dialects of Pomerania are compiled and described in the Pommersches Wörterbuch ("Pomeranian Dictionary"), a dictionary of the German dialects spoken within the Province of Pomerania's borders in 1936.

East Pomeranian dialect of East Low German is also spoken in Brazil (see Pomerode, in Santa Catarina, Santa Maria de Jetibá, in Espírito Santo, and Arroio do Padre, Morro Redondo, Turuçu, Canguçu, São Lourenço do Sul and Pelotas, in Rio Grande do Sul).

History 

By the early Middle Ages, Pomerania was largely populated by Slavic Pomeranians and Liuticians, who spoke the Pomeranian and Polabian languages. During the High Middle Ages, Germans from northern parts of the Holy Roman Empire settled in Pomerania as part of the medieval Ostsiedlung. Most Slavic Pomeranians gradually became Germanized. The new Pomeranian dialects which emerged from the admixture of the Low German dialects of the settlers are classified as East Low German.

After World War II, Germans east of the Oder-Neisse line were expelled to post-war Germany. Most varieties of East Pomeranian dialect have largely died out in the following decades as the expellees were assimilated into their new homes, although West Pomeranian and Central Pomeranian are still spoken in Vorpommern (Western or Hither Pomerania), part of the German state of Mecklenburg-Vorpommern.

As a result of German immigration to Brazil, there are still some communities speaking East Pomeranian in Rio Grande do Sul, Santa Catarina and Espírito Santo.

Writers
Fritz Reuter and Heinrich Bandlow are among the most famous East Low German writers.

See also

Prussia
Nordostniederdeutsch

References

External links
 Plautdietsch Freunde e.V.

Low German
German-Brazilian culture
German dialects
Languages of Brazil
Pomerania